The Irish Newspaper Archives is a commercial online database of digitised Irish newspapers, and claims to be the world's oldest and largest archive of Irish newspapers.

Subscription-free access to the archive is available to users in Irish public libraries and schools.

References

External links

Online archives
Irish news websites
Mass media in the Republic of Ireland